Anhalidine  is a naturally occurring tetrahydroisoquinoline based alkaloid which can be isolated from Lophophora williamsii; it has also been detected other cactii and several species of Acacia. It is part of a family of compounds that are structurally related to mescaline.

See also
 Pellotine

References

Lophophora
Isoquinoline alkaloids
Norsalsolinol ethers